Simon Property Group, Inc. is an American real estate investment trust that invests in shopping malls, outlet centers, and community/lifestyle centers. It is the largest owner of shopping malls in the United States and is headquartered in Indianapolis, Indiana.

History
Simon Property Group dates to 1960, when brothers Melvin Simon and Herbert Simon began developing strip malls in Indianapolis, Indiana. In December 1993, they took their interests public as Simon Property Group in the largest initial public offering of a real estate investment trust to date. Simon Property merged with the newly public DeBartolo Realty Corporation, owner of the real estate assets of Edward J. DeBartolo Sr., in 1996 to form Simon DeBartolo Group.

In 1997, the company acquired The Retail Property Trust for $1.2 billion in a hostile takeover. Also in 1997, in partnership with Macerich, the company acquired 12 malls from IBM's pension plan for $974.5 million. One year after these acquisitions, the company acquired Corporate Property Investors and was renamed Simon Property Group. The company also acquired an ownership interest in Groupe BEG, S.A., operator of shopping centers in Europe.

In 1999, the company acquired 14 shopping centers from New England Development for $725 million.

In 2002, in partnership with Westfield Group and The Rouse Company, the company acquired 13 properties from Rodamco North America including Copley Place, Houston Galleria, and SouthPark Mall.

In 2003, Simon acquired a majority interest The Kravco Company, owner of the King of Prussia, for $300 million.

In 2004, the company entered the outlet mall business with the acquisition of Chelsea Property Group Inc. for $3.5 billion.

In April 2007, Simon and Farallon Capital acquired the Mills Corporation.

In 2009, Simon tried to buy malls owned by General Growth Properties. In February 2010, Simon placed a bid acquire General Growth, which was in bankruptcy protection. However, the bid was rejected by GGP. A GGP shareholder filed suit (Young v. Bucksbaum) against the company's board of directors for rejecting Simon's bid, alleging breach of fiduciary duty. In April 2010, Simon offered to make a $2.5 billion equity investment in GGP including a $1 billion investment by Paulson & Co. In May 2010, Simon withdrew from the bidding for GGP after GGP favored transactions with Brookfield Asset Management.

In May 2010, Simon acquired Prime Retail's Prime Outlets-Puerto Rico in Barceloneta, Puerto Rico In August 2010, Simon acquired an additional 21 outlet malls, including locations in Williamsburg, Virginia, San Marcos, Texas and Hagerstown, Maryland for a total of $2.3 billion.

In December 2010, Simon made a $4.5 billion bid for Capital Shopping Centres Group plc; however, the offer was rejected and withdrawn in January 2011.

In September 2011, Simon acquired Southdale Center in Edina, Minnesota.

In August 2013, Toronto Premium Outlets opened in Halton Hills, Ontario, Canada. In October 2014, Premium Outlets Montreal, the second in Canada, opened. In May 2018, Premium Outlet Collection YEG opened at Edmonton International Airport.

In May 2014, the company completed the corporate spin-off of Washington Prime Group, headed by Mark Ordan, the final CEO of Mills Corporation.

In January 2015, Washington Prime Group acquired Glimcher Realty Trust and was renamed WP Glimcher. As part of the deal, Simon acquired Jersey Gardens in Elizabeth, New Jersey and University Park Village in Fort Worth, Texas, while WP Glimcher acquired Brunswick Square in East Brunswick, New Jersey from Simon.

In March 2015, the company offered $23.3 billion for Macerich; however the offer was rejected and withdrawn in April 2015.

In September 2016, in partnership with Authentic Brands Group and GGP Inc., the company acquired Aéropostale.

In February 2020, in partnership with Authentic Brands Group, the company acquired Forever 21.

On March 18, 2020, the company announced the closure of its U.S. shopping malls until March 29, due to the COVID-19 pandemic. At the time, it was the largest mall owner in the U.S.

In August 2020, the company discussed repurposing large stores into warehouses and fulfillment centers for Amazon. Also in August 2020, in partnership with Authentic Brands, the company acquired Brooks Brothers and Lucky Brand Jeans.

In December 2020, the company acquired Taubman Centers for $3.4 billion. It also acquired J.C. Penney in partnership with Brookfield Asset Management.

In April 2022, it was announced that Simon and Brookfield are set to offer to buy Kohl's.

Simon purchased a 50% stake in Jamestown, a real estate developer, in October 2022.

Legal record
In 2007, the company was sued for banning the use of Segways, which the plaintiff claimed was in violation of the Americans With Disabilities Act.

In 2009, the company was sued by a nightclub for racial discrimination for allegedly blocking its main entrance since the majority of its clientele were black.

In 2011, the company was sued for allegedly firing a woman because she was pregnant.

In 2011, the company agreed to pay $125,000 to settle allegations by the Equal Employment Opportunity Commission that Latino janitors working for the company were subjected to daily verbal attacks because of their national origin.

See also 

 List of Simon Property Group properties

References

External links

 

 
Companies listed on the New York Stock Exchange
Financial services companies established in 1993
Real estate companies established in 1993
Companies based in Indianapolis
Shopping center management firms
Real estate investment trusts of the United States
1993 establishments in Indiana